Piero Gamba (16 September 1936 – 30 January 2022), also known as Pierino Gamba, was an Italian orchestral conductor and pianist.

Biography 
Born in Rome, Italy on 16 September 1936, Gamba came to attention as a child prodigy.

He won the Arnold Bax Memorial Medal in 1962 and during the 1960s he conducted the Philharmonia, and the London Symphony Orchestra, with whom he also recorded for Decca Records. From 1971 to 1980, he was the musical director and conductor of the Winnipeg Symphony Orchestra in Winnipeg, Canada. He was the chief conductor of the Adelaide Symphony Orchestra in Australia from 1983 to 1986, and conducted many other Australian orchestras during this time. He was the musical director and conductor of the SODRE National Symphonic Orchestra of Uruguay from 1994 till 1995 as well as from 2001 till 2004. Gamba was one of the founders of Symphonicum Europae Foundation, an institution whose aim is to promote greater harmony of mankind through the arts.

Gamba lived in New York City, pursued his career and teaching orchestra conducting. He died on 30 January 2022, at the age of 85.

Collaborations 
During his long career of some seventy years he has worked with many artists, who have performed under his direction. Amongst them: 
 
  Luciano Pavarotti
  Arthur Rubinstein
  Yehudi Menuhin
  Roberta Peters
  Maureen Forrester
  Van Cliburn
  Mstislav Rostropovitch
  Gary Graffman
  Erling Blöndal Bengtsson
  Julius Katchen
  Richard Tucker
  Zara Nelsova
  Ida Haendel
  Ruggiero Ricci
  Alfredo Campoli
  Michael Rabin
  Vladimir Ashkenazy
  Jean-Pierre Rampal
  Henryk Szeryng
  Camila Wicks
  Dylana Jenson
  Jorge Bolet
  Itzhak Perlman
  Byron Janis
  Pierre de Groote
  Philip Levy
  Ramon Parcells
  Ted Oien
  Doug Bairstow
  Igor Oistrach
  Stefan Askenase
  Arthur Polson
  Sequeira Costa
  Simon O'Neill
  Peter Schaffer
  Lionel Bowman
  Marek Jablonski
  Pierre Fournier
  Carlos Montoya
  Moira Birks
  Jeanette Kearney
  Robert Merrill
  Veronica Tyler
  Raymond Michalski
  Krysztof Jablonski
  Claude Hauri
  Sandra Silvera
  Maurice André
  Jeremy Menuhin
  Jorge Risi
  José Greco
  Peter Ustinov
  Philip Newman
  Eugene Istomin
  György Sándor
  Raquel Boldorini
  Fernando Hasaj
  Dennis Brain
  Daniel Barenboim
  Dame Malvina Major
  Harry Belafonte
  Maite Berrueta
  Zina Schift
  Rita Contino
  Jan Pierce
  Jeanne-Marie Darré
  Fernando Barabino
  John Ogdon
  Mario Carbotta
  Nibya Marino
  Jacinto Gimbernard
  Cecile Licad
  Jaime Bolipata
  Bruno Leonardo Gelber
  Hans Lehman
  Magda Longari
  Nana Lorca
  Morley Meredith
  Oxana Jablonskaya
  Alexander Uninsky
  Hilda Waldeland
  Victor Addiego
  John Williams
  Betty Allen
  John McCollum
  Santiago Garmendia
  Janis Eckhart
  Luis Giron May
  José Iturbi
  Santiago Cervera
  Emanuel Ax
  Jeffrey Siegel
  Martino Tirimo
  Gerardo Marandino
  Vincent Frittelli
  Raffaela Acella
  Orlando Sisalema
  Jonathan Floril
  Nina Milkina
  Esteban Sánchez
  Alejandro Barletta
  Aldo Ciccolini
  William Molina
  Roselyn Tucker V.
  Santigo Garmendia
  Sergio Caram
  Luis Pomi
  Marisa Robles
  Graciela Lassner
  Alicia Gabriela Martinez
  Uto Ughi
  Juan Bello
  Andrea Griminelli
  Eduardo Alfonso
  Andre Wolf
  Luz del Alba Rubio
  Luis Batlle
  Philippe Entremont
  Leopoldo Querol
  Eduardo Fernandez
  Rafael Martinez
  Abel Mus
  Endre Wolf
  Xenia Prochorova
  Ivan Perez
  Eddy Marcano
  Frederico Aldao
  Eiko Senda
  Maria Lujan Mirabelli
  Ariel Cazes
  Nina Beilina
  Alexander Moutouzkine
  Shura Cherkassky
  Jan Smeterlin
  Elida Gencarelli
  Anabel Garcia del Castillo
  Peter Katin
  Pascual Camps
  José Cubiles
  Khristian Benitez
  Jesus Hernandez
  Jorge Risi
  Stanley Weiner
  Michael Ponti
  Marjorie Mitchell
  Ieuan Jones en Jame Peters.

Honours 
Gamba was an Honorary Conductor for Life of the following orchestras:
 Philharmonia Antwerpen
 Orquesta Sinfonica de Madrid
 Orquesta Filarmonica Barcelona
 Orquesta da Camara Barcelona
 Orquesta A.P.O. Buenos Aires
 Orquesta A.U.D.E.M. Montevideo
 Asociacion Coral Porto.

Discography 
Gamba mostly recorded with the following orchestras:

 London Symphony Orchestra (Decca Records, London Records),
 Philharmonia and the New Philharmonia (His Master's Voice, EMI),
 The Royal Danish Orchestra (TONO),
 The Copenhagen Philharmonic Orchestra,
 The Winnipeg Symphony Orchestra (CBC Records), and
 The Symphonicum Europae Orchestra.

These are a few of his available recordings:
 Beethoven: Piano Concertos Nos. 3-5, Piero Gamba conducts the London Symphony Orchestra, and Julius Katchen (Audio CD 1996)
 Beethoven: The Piano Concertos; Choral Fantasy; Diabelli Variations, Piero Gamba conducts the London Symphony Orchestra, and Julius Katchen (Audio CD 2007) Box set
 Liszt: The Piano Concertos, Ataulfo Argenta, Piero Gamba conducts the London Philharmonic Orchestra, and London Symphony Orchestra (Audio CD 2002)
 Rossini: Overtures, Piero Gamba conducts the London Symphony Orchestra (Audio CD 1990)
 Rossini: Overtures, Piero Gamba conducts the London Symphony Orchestra (Audio CD 2004) Original recording remastered

References

External links 

 Official website
 La Grande Aurora (The Great Dawn) is a semi-biographical account of Pierino Gamba's early musical genius.
 Video of Pierino Gamba conducting an orchestra aged 11 in 1947.

1936 births
2022 deaths
21st-century American male musicians
21st-century Italian conductors (music)
21st-century Italian male musicians
21st-century pianists
Child classical musicians
Italian male conductors (music)
Italian male pianists
Musicians from New York City
Musicians from Rome